Lee Hyun-woo, born Lee Sang-won (March 6, 1966), also known as Jessie Lee, is a Korean-American singer and actor.

Career
Lee Hyun-woo made his entertainment debut in 1991 with the album Black Rainbow and rose to fame with hit songs such as "Dream" and "Day After the Break-up." He later transitioned into acting, appearing in television dramas such as Cats on the Roof (2003), Wedding (2005), Dal-ja's Spring (2007) and Oh! My Lady (2010), as well as the films S Diary (2004), Before the Summer Passes Away (2007), and The Forgotten Bag (2011).

Personal life
Lee married freelance curator Lee Je-ni on February 21, 2009. Their first son Lee Dong-ha was born in September 2009, and their second son Lee Ju-ha was born in April 2011; both appeared with him in the reality show The Return of Superman.

On January 13, 1993, Lee was arrested on suspicion of marijuana possession; he was released on bail on February 1. In March 1993, he was banned from appearing on the TV networks KBS and SBS, so he went on hiatus and lived in the United States until his return to the Korean entertainment scene in November of that year. He was also fined for an incident involving a DUI and driving without a license on February 18, 2007.

Discography

Album
 Black Rainbow (1991)
 Blue Vanity (1993)
 Let's Go Fishing (1996)
 Freewill of My Heart (1997)
 Both Sides of the Story (1998)
 Virus (2000)
 Free Your Mind & Body (2001)
 Da Painkiller (2003)
 Sinful Seduction (2004)
 Heart Blossom (2007)
 Till Dawn (2011)

Soundtrack contributions
"I Wish I Had a Wife"  (track from I Wish I Had a Wife OST, 2001)
"지금 내게 필요한 건..." (track from Man in Crisis OST, 2002)
"Join in Love"  (track from Exhibition of Fireworks OST, 2006)
"Can't Stop Loving You" (track from The Invisible Man, Choi Jang-soo OST, 2006)
"Love Night" (track from Loving You a Thousand Times OST, 2009)
"Hero" (feat. Lee Ha-neul and Sohyang) (track from Hero, 2012)

Filmography

Television series
Cats on the Roof (MBC, 2003)
The Woman Who Wants to Marry (MBC, 2004)
Sad Love Story (MBC, 2005)
Wedding (KBS2, 2005) 
Love Can't Wait (MBC, 2006)
Singles Game (SBS, 2006)
Dal-ja's Spring (KBS2, 2007)
Oh! My Lady (SBS, 2010)
Salamander Guru and The Shadows (SBS, 2012) (cameo, episode 5)
A Hundred Year Legacy (MBC, 2013)
Ruby Ring (KBS2, 2013)
Entertainer (SBS, 2016)

Film
Saturday, 2 p.m. (1998)
The Beauty in Dream (2002)
S Diary (2004)
My Boyfriend Is Type B (2005)
Ssunday Seoul (2006)
Before the Summer Passes Away (2007)
The Forgotten Bag (2011)

Variety show
Wednesday Art Stage (MBC, 1997–2004)
Showdown! Star Chef (SBS, 2009)
I Am a Singer (MBC, 2012)
The Return of Superman (KBS2, 2013)
King of Mask Singer (MBC, 2016)

Musical theatre
Singles (2007)
Mamma Mia! (2011; 2016)

Radio program
Lee Hyun-woo's Music Live (SBS Power FM)
Lee Hyun-woo's Music Album (KBS 2FM)

Cookbook author
Lee Hyun-woo's Easy Cooking for Singles (2002)
Happy Recipes of Happy Dad Lee Hyun-woo (2010)

References

External links

1966 births
Living people
South Korean male singers
South Korean male television actors
South Korean male film actors
South Korean male musical theatre actors
South Korean male stage actors
South Korean radio presenters
American musicians of Korean descent
Parsons School of Design alumni